Eddie Lee Priest (born April 8, 1974) is a former Major League Baseball pitcher.

Priest went to Susan Moore High School in Blountsville, Alabama. The Cincinnati Reds drafted Priest in the ninth round of the 1994 Major League Baseball Draft. He played for the Cincinnati Reds in 1998, appearing in two games: May 27 and June 1.

On June 16, 1998, the Reds traded Priest with Christian Rojas to the Cleveland Indians for Rick Krivda. The Reds selected Priest off waivers after the season.

External links

1974 births
Living people
People from Boaz, Alabama
Baseball players from Alabama
Major League Baseball pitchers
Cincinnati Reds players
Nashua Pride players
Southern Union State Bison baseball players
Billings Mustangs players
Buffalo Bisons (minor league) players
Charleston AlleyCats players
Chattanooga Lookouts players
Indianapolis Indians players
Las Vegas 51s players
Winston-Salem Warthogs players